The 1950 Latin Cup was the second edition of the annual Latin Cup which was played by clubs of the Southwest European nations of France, Italy, Portugal, and Spain. The tournament was hosted by Portugal, and the Portuguese club SL Benfica was the winner of the tournament after defeating FC Girondins de Bordeaux by a score of 2–1 in the final match replay after sudden death extra time.

Participating teams

Venues 

The host of the tournament was Portugal, and all matches were played in one host stadium.

Tournament

Bracket

Semifinals

Third place match

Final

Final replay

Goalscorers

Notes

References

External links 

 Latin Cup (Full Results) from RSSSF

Latin Cup
International association football competitions hosted by Portugal
June 1950 sports events in Europe